Katie Williams  may refer to:

Katie Williams (footballer)
Katie Williams, character in Family Affairs

See also
Kate Williams (disambiguation)
Katherine Williams (disambiguation)
Williams (surname)